Coates Mills is an unincorporated village in the Canadian province of Kent County, New Brunswick.

History

It was named after John Coates who immigrated from England in 1810, was the first postmaster of the province. In 1904 there was 1 post office, 1 sawmill, 1 grist mill, 1 church in Coates Mills and a population of 100.

Notable people

See also
List of communities in New Brunswick

References

Communities in Kent County, New Brunswick